Mayacamas may refer to:

 Mayacamas Mountains or Mayacmas Mountains, in Napa Valley, California
 Mayacamas Vineyards, a California wine producer